This is a list of Abilene Christian Wildcats football players in the NFL Draft.

Key

Selections

References

Abilene Christian

Abilene Christian Wildcats NFL Draft